Jamell Fleming (born May 5, 1989) is a former American football cornerback in the National Football League. Originally drafted by the Arizona Cardinals in the third round of the 2012 NFL Draft, he also played for the Jacksonville Jaguars and the Kansas City Chiefs. He played college football at Oklahoma.

College career
Fleming attended the University of Oklahoma from 2007 to 2011. He finished his career with 168 tackles, seven interceptions, two touchdown and a sack. As a junior, he was the Defensive MVP of the 2011 Fiesta Bowl.

Professional career

Pre-draft
He was considered one of the best cornerback prospects for the 2012 NFL Draft.

Arizona Cardinals
On April 28, 2012, Fleming was selected by the Arizona Cardinals in the third round (80th pick overall) of the 2012 NFL Draft. He was released on September 14, 2013.

Jacksonville Jaguars
On September 16, 2013, Fleming was claimed off waivers by the Jacksonville Jaguars. He was released by the Jaguars on August 30, 2014.

Baltimore Ravens
Fleming was signed to the Baltimore Ravens' practice squad on September 3, 2014.

Kansas City Chiefs
Fleming was signed off the Baltimore Ravens' practice squad by the Kansas City Chiefs on September 12, 2014. On September 3, 2016, he was released by the Chiefs.

References

External links
 
 Oklahoma Sooners bio
 Jacksonville Jaguars bio

1989 births
Living people
American football cornerbacks
Oklahoma Sooners football players
People from Edinburg, Texas
Arizona Cardinals players
Jacksonville Jaguars players
Baltimore Ravens players
Kansas City Chiefs players